The 1st Parliament of Ceylon was a meeting of the Parliament of Ceylon, with the membership determined by the results of the 1947 parliamentary election between 23 August and 20 September 1947. The parliament met for the first time on 14 October 1947 and was dissolved on 8 April 1952.

Election

Results

Members
J R Jayawardane – Minister of finance
S. W. R. D. Bandaranayake – Minister of health
 Tuan Burhanudeen Jayah (1947–1950)

References
 
 
 
 
 
 
 
 
 
 
 

Parliament of Sri Lanka
1994 Sri Lankan parliamentary election